Amaro Montenegro is a traditional amaro distilled in Bologna, Italy. It is made from a secret blend of 40 botanicals including vanilla, orange peels and eucalyptus. The amaro was first produced by Stanislao Cobianchi in 1885 and was originally called Elisir Lungavita. In 1896, it was renamed Amaro Montenegro, after Princess Elena of Montenegro who married Crown Prince Victor Emmanuel, the future King Victor Emmanuel III of Italy . Its production takes place in the factory of San Lazzaro di Savena (Province of Bologna) of Montenegro Srl.

Cobianchi travelled from continent to continent collecting 40 rinds, woods, seeds, rhizomes, flowers, fruits, citrus peels, roots, stems and leaves.

Amaro Montenegro is the result of a process that has been passed down through generations, unchanged since 1885. The Master Herbalist oversees the entire production process, just as Cobianchi once did.

The famous Italian writer Gabriele D'Annunzio once described it as the "liquor of virtues".

Production process 
The 40 botanicals and caramel colour that comprise Amaro Montenegro come from four continents. Some of these perfumes are from the Mediterranean, such as coriander and Artemisia, as well as some aromatic plants, oregano and marjoram, with bitter and sweet oranges, nutmeg, cloves and cinnamon. Once they reach the herbalist's workshop, the botanicals undergo three different forms of extraction: boiling, maceration and distillation.

After this, twelve mother essences are taken and synthesized into six tasting notes: bitter and herbaceous, spicy and floral, chocolate and caramel, fresh and balsamic, vanilla and red fruits, and warm and tropical.

One final element is added to these six notes, called "Premio"; it is the final and fundamental ingredient of the secret recipe. These are finally added to alcohol, water and sugar to leave a bitter-orange flavoured spirit with an abv of 23%.

The Premio is the result of the micro-distillation of five botanicals. One litre for every 15,000 is enough to complete the recipe.

Amaro Montenegro can be drunk on its own or used as an ingredient in many cocktails.

References

Italian liqueurs
Bologna
Products introduced in 1885
Herbal liqueurs
Italian brands